The 1979 Egyptian Open was a men's tennis tournament played on outdoor clay courts that was part of the 1979 Colgate-Palmolive Grand Prix . It was the fourth edition of the tournament and was played in Cairo,  Egypt from 9 April until 15 April 1979. Third-seeded Peter Feigl won the singles title.

Finals

Singles
 Peter Feigl defeated  Carlos Kirmayr 7–5, 3–6, 6–1
 It was Feigl's 1st singles title of the year and the 2nd of his career.

Doubles
 Peter McNamara /  Paul McNamee defeated  Anand Amritraj /  Vijay Amritraj 7–5, 6–4

References

External links
 ITF tournament edition details

Cairo Open
Cairo Open
1979 in Egyptian sport